Manitoba Provincial Road 220 (PR 220) is a provincial road in the Interlake region of Manitoba, Canada.

Route description
It runs northwest in concurrency with Grassemere Road to a junction with PR 409 and then turns north, heading to Provincial Trunk Highway (PTH) 67.  

North of PTH 67, PR 220 continues  to Oak Hammock Marsh where its designated route terminates at the park's access road.  The road itself continues a short distance as Municipal Road 14E.  This section was added to PR 220 in the mid-1980s.

References

External links
Official Manitoba Highway Map

220